KYUS-FM (92.3 FM, "92.3 KYUS FM") is a radio station licensed to serve Miles City, Montana.  The station is owned by Marks Radio Group and the broadcast license is held by Custer County Community Broadcasting. It airs an adult hits music format.

History

KMCM-FM
The station began broadcasting November 30, 1984, and originally held the call sign KMCM-FM. It was owned by William J. O'Brien. In 1986, the station was sold to Austin J. Baillon, along with AM 1050 KCCA, for $300,000. KMCM-FM aired an adult contemporary format. In 1997, the station was sold to Senger Broadcasting, along with AM 1050 KMTA, for $594,000.

KKRY
In October 1997, the station adopted a country music format and its call sign was changed to KKRY. The station was branded "Hot Country 92.5" (and later "Hot Country 92.3"). In 2005, the station's frequency was changed from 92.5 MHz to 92.3 MHz. In 2006, KKRY was sold to Stephen Marks's Custer County Community Broadcasting Corporation, along with AM 1050 KMTA, for $540,000.

KYUS-FM
The station's call sign was changed to KYUS-FM on January 26, 2007. The station adopted an adult hits format.

References

External links

YUS-FM
Adult hits radio stations in the United States
Custer County, Montana
Radio stations established in 1984
1984 establishments in Montana
Miles City, Montana